Diane Hendrina Edelijn (born 12 June 1960 in Rotterdam, South Holland) is a former backstroke swimmer from the Netherlands, who competed for her native country at the 1976 Summer Olympics in Montreal, Quebec, Canada. There, she finished in eighth position in the 100m backstroke, while she was eliminated in the third heat of the 200m backstroke. With the Dutch relay team, Edelijn ended up in fifth place in the 4 × 100 m medley, alongside Wijda Mazereeuw (breaststroke), José Damen (butterfly), and Enith Brigitha (freestyle).

References

1960 births
Living people
Olympic swimmers of the Netherlands
Dutch female backstroke swimmers
Swimmers at the 1976 Summer Olympics
Swimmers from Rotterdam
20th-century Dutch women